Galtier is a surname. Notable people with the surname include: 

Christophe Galtier (born 1966), French footballer and manager
Francis Galtier (born 1907), French sprinter 
Jean Galtier-Boissière (1891-1966), French writer, polemicist and journalist
Jordan Galtier (born 1989), French footballer and manager
Lucien Galtier (c. 1811–1866), American Catholic priest
Pierre-Victor Galtier (1846-1908), French veterinarian